Camp Pardee is a company town for the operators of Pardee Dam. It is located in Calaveras County, California, near Pardee Reservoir. It lies at an elevation of 696 feet (212 m) and is home to 35 people.

Climate
Camp Pardee has a hot-summer Mediterranean climate (Csa) according to the Köppen climate classification system.

References

Unincorporated communities in California
Unincorporated communities in Calaveras County, California